Alexandru Ioan Arșinel (4 June 1939 – 29 September 2022) was a Romanian comedian and actor. He was born in Dolhasca, Kingdom of Romania.

Arșinel was an ethnic Aromanian.

On screen, Arșinel was well-known for his partnership with Stela Popescu, with whom he starred in films such as Cine e Didina? (1972).

In 2006 and 2011 the actor was chosen by Disney Pixar to provide the Romanian voice of Sheriff in the animated movie Cars. He died on 29 September 2022.

Filmography
Ana și "hoțul" (1981);
Ca-n filme (1983);
Colierul de turcoaze (1985);
În fiecare zi mi-e dor de tine (1987);
Flăcăul cu o singură bretea (1990);
Miss Litoral (1990);
A doua cădere a Constantinopolului (1993);
Paradisul în direct (1994);
Cuscrele (2005-2006)
Rǎzboiul Sexelor (2007–2008)
Regina (2008-2009)
Moștenirea (2010-2011)
Toată lumea din familia noastră (2012)
O săptămână nebună (2014)
Fetele lu domn profesor (2014)
Un Crăciun altfel (2014).

References

External links

https://web.archive.org/web/20101101084904/http://www.cronicaromana.ro/alexandru-arsinel-satisfactia-unei-cariere-de-succes-imi-hraneste-sperantele-de-viitor.html

1939 births
2022 deaths
Romanian people of Aromanian descent
Aromanian actors
Romanian comedians
Romanian film actors
Romanian stage actors
Romanian television actors
Caragiale National University of Theatre and Film alumni
Recipients of the Order of Cultural Merit (Romania)
People from Suceava County